La Très Sainte Trinosophie, The Most Holy Trinosophia, or The Most Holy Threefold Wisdom, is a French esoteric book, allegedly authored by Alessandro Cagliostro or the Count of St. Germain. Due to the dearth of evidence of authorship, however, there is significant doubt surrounding the subject. Dated to the late 18th century, the 96-page book is divided into twelve sections representing the twelve zodiacal signs. The veiled content is said to refer to an allegorical initiation, detailing many kabbalistic, alchemical and masonic mysteries. The original MS 2400 at the Library of Troyes is richly illustrated with numerous symbolical plates.

Contents
In a self-published 1933 translation featuring parallel French and English texts, Manly P. Hall wrote:

Manly Palmer Hall then cites Dr. Edward C. Getsinger, "an eminent authority on ancient alphabets and languages," in emphasizing that La Très Sainte Trinosophie is couched in secret codes intended to conceal its contents from the profane.

Disposition
The original copy remains in the Library at Troyes, designated as MS 2400.

Authorship controversy

Some controversy persists over the authorship of the work. Ascribing authorship to the Count of St. Germain rests on a "bookseller's note" pasted to the front of the MS in Troyes, as well as Manly Palmer Hall's own statements, which have been described as partisan. Indeed, Mr. Hall states that the MS was very much in the possession of Cagliostro, who is alleged to be one potential author of the manuscript, but that "the Inquisition had seized it" when Cagliostro was arrested in Rome in 1789.

References

External links

 ‘’The Most Holy Trinosophia: A Book of the Dead’’. Fully restored manuscript. 
 La Très Sainte Trinosophie. Most color plates depicted.
La Très Sainte Trinosophie. English version adapted from Manly Palmer Hall's edition of 1933.
 Count St. Germain, The Most Holy Trinosophia, with Introductory Material and Commentary by Manly Hall (Los Angeles: The Phoenix Press, 1933)
 La Très Sainte Trinosophie, Google Books version in Italian.
 Webversion in German and English

Occult books
Alessandro Cagliostro